The 1995 Qatar Open, known as the 1995 Qatar Mobil Open for sponsorship reasons, was a men's tennis ATP tournament held in Doha, Qatar and played on outdoor hard courts. The event was part of the World Series of the 1995 ATP Tour. It was the third edition of the tournament and was held from 2 January through 9 January 1995.

First-seeded Stefan Edberg won the singles title, his second win in Doha, having won the singles title in 1994.

Finals

Singles

 Stefan Edberg defeated  Magnus Larsson, 7–6(7–4), 6–1
 It was Edberg's only singles title of the year, and the 41st and last of his career.

Doubles

 Stefan Edberg /  Magnus Larsson defeated  Andrei Olhovskiy /  Jan Siemerink, 7–6, 6–2

References

External links
 ITF tournament edition details

 
Qatar Open
Qatar Open (tennis)
1995 in Qatari sport